Prayagraj Power Generation Company Limited is a coal-based, 3*660MW, super critical thermal power plant located in Bara Tehsil in Allahabad District, Uttar Pradesh. The power plant is owned by Renascent Power, a subsidiary of the Tata Power. The total cost of the project was INR 12,000 crores. In November 2019 Resurgent Power Ventures Pte. Limited (Resurgent Power) has announced closing the deal for acquiring 75 per cent stake in Jaiprakash Associates Ltd's Prayagraj Power.

Capacity
The planned capacity of the power plant is 3 x 660 MW.

References

External links

 Bara Thermal Power Project at SourceWatch

Coal-fired power stations in Uttar Pradesh
Allahabad district
2015 establishments in Uttar Pradesh
Energy infrastructure completed in 2015